Hocine El Orfi (born January 27, 1987, in Bou Saâda) is an Algerian footballer. He plays mainly as a defensive midfielder.

Club career
Born in Bou Saâda, El Orfi began his career in the youth ranks of his hometown club, Amel Bou Saâda, eventually making his way to the first team. In 2007, he signed for Paradou AC.

JS Kabylie
On June 4, 2010, El Orfi was loaned out by Paradou AC to JS Kabylie for one season. On May 1, 2011, El Orfi started for JS Kabylie in the 2011 Algerian Cup Final where they beat USM El Harrach 1–0 to win the trophy. In June 2011, his loan was extended for another season.

USM Alger
In the summer of 2012, El Orfi joined USM Alger from Paradou AC, signing a two-year contract. The transfer fee was not disclosed. On September 15, he made his debut for the club as starter in the first week encounter of the 2012–13 Algerian Ligue Professionnelle 1 against CS Constantine.

International career
On October 3, 2012, El Orfi received his first official call-up to the Algeria national football team for the return leg of the 2013 Africa Cup of Nations qualifier against Libya.

Honours

Club
 USM Alger
 Algerian Ligue Professionnelle 1 (2): 2013-14, 2015-16
 Algerian Cup (1): 2013
 Algerian Super Cup (1): 2013
 UAFA Club Cup (1): 2013

 JS Kabylie
 Algerian Cup (1): 2011

References

External links
 
 

1987 births
Algerian footballers
Algeria international footballers
Algerian expatriate footballers
Living people
People from Bou Saâda
JS Kabylie players
Paradou AC players
Algerian Ligue Professionnelle 1 players
Saudi First Division League players
USM Alger players
Amal Bou Saâda players
CR Belouizdad players
Al-Mujazzal Club players
Association football midfielders
Expatriate footballers in Saudi Arabia
Algerian expatriate sportspeople in Saudi Arabia
21st-century Algerian people